In enzymology, a glycerol dehydrogenase (acceptor) is an enzyme that catalyzes the chemical reaction

glycerol + acceptor  glycerone + reduced acceptor

Thus, the two substrates of this enzyme are glycerol and acceptor, whereas its two products are glycerone and reduced acceptor.

This enzyme belongs to the family of oxidoreductases, specifically those acting on the CH-OH group of donor with other acceptors.  The systematic name of this enzyme class is glycerol:acceptor 1-oxidoreductase. This enzyme is also called glycerol:(acceptor) 1-oxidoreductase.  It employs one cofactor, PQQ.

References

 

EC 1.1.99
Pyrroloquinoline quinone enzymes
Enzymes of unknown structure